Anguillospora is a genus of fungi belonging to the family Amniculicolaceae. It was circumscribed by Cecil Terence Ingold in 1942, with Anguillospora longissima assigned as the type species. It was found as a root endophytic fungus in the plant Equisetum scirpoides. It is related to the genera Amniculicola and Lophiostoma. The genus has a cosmopolitan distribution.

Species
, Species Fungorum accepts 11 species of Anguillospora.
Anguillospora crassa 
Anguillospora curvula 
Anguillospora filiformis 
Anguillospora furtiva 
Anguillospora gigantea 
Anguillospora mediocris 
Anguillospora pseudolongissima 
Anguillospora pulchella 
Anguillospora rubescens 
Anguillospora virginiana

References

Pleosporales
Taxa described in 1942
Dothideomycetes genera
Taxa named by Cecil Terence Ingold